Grenville Lewis, Jr. (November 12, 1875 – September 27, 1964) was an American engineer, cattle rancher, and college football coach. He served as the head football coach at Maryland Agricultural College—now known as the University of Maryland, College Park—in 1896, compiling a record of 6–2–2.

Biography
Lewis was born on November 12, 1875, in Washington, D.C., where he received a public education, including at the Business High School. He attended the Maryland Agricultural College, where he played as a fullback on the football team in 1894 and served as team captain in 1896. In his two seasons as a Maryland player, Lewis played every minute of each game. The school briefly discontinued its football team in 1895, but resurrected it the following year. As team captain in 1896, Lewis instituted the program's first physical training regimen, which included calisthenics and long-distance running. As coach in 1896, Lewis compiled a 6–2–2 record. Lewis also played on the baseball team and served as its captain in 1897. He graduated in 1897 with a Bachelor of Science degree from the school's Scientific Course. In 1897, Lewis intended to commute to College Park from Washington, D.C. to assist Maryland captain and player-coach John Lillibridge with his coaching duties. However, the Columbian University (now George Washington University) Law School offered Lewis a scholarship and a position as football coach, captain, and fullback, which he accepted.

After college, Lewis worked in cattle ranching in Honduras until 1900. He then worked for Clark and Krebs Consulting Engineers in Charleston, West Virginia through 1905. In April 1904, he married Lillian Compton née Snowden. Lewis worked as an engineer on the Virginian Railway, a superintendent for the New Etna Coal Company in Chattanooga, Tennessee, and for the Straight Creek Coal and Coke Company in Kentucky until 1908. He was then president and manager of the Ideal Block Coal Company in Lily, Kentucky. Lewis lived in Pineville, Kentucky and was a member of the American Institute of Mining, Metallurgical, and Petroleum Engineers. In 1916, he was working as a superintendent for the Virginia Iron, Coal and Coke Company.

Lewis later lived in Hollywood, Maryland and died in September 1964.

Head coaching record

References

1875 births
1964 deaths
19th-century players of American football
American cattlemen
American engineers
American football fullbacks
Business High School (Washington, D.C.) alumni
Player-coaches
George Washington Colonials football players
George Washington Colonials football coaches
Maryland Terrapins baseball players
Maryland Terrapins football coaches
Maryland Terrapins football players
George Washington University Law School alumni
People from Bell County, Kentucky
People from Hollywood, Maryland
Coaches of American football from Washington, D.C.
Players of American football from Washington, D.C.
American expatriates in Honduras